Richard A. O'Brien (1880–1933) was an American Jesuit official who served as rector of Ateneo de Manila University and athletic director of Boston College.

Early life
O'Brien was born in Baltimore in 1880. His father, William J. O'Brien, was a member of the United States House of Representatives and a judge of the orphans' court of Baltimore. His brother was Frederick O'Brien, author of White Shadows in the South Seas. O'Brien entered the Jesuit order in 1901 and studied at Woodstock College. He was ordained in 1912 and completed his tertianship at St. Andrew-on-Hudson in Poughkeepsie, New York in 1915.

Boston College
In 1915 O'Brien joined the Boston College faculty as a professor of Latin, Greek, English, and Evidence of Religion as well as faculty director of athletics. During his tenure as athletic director, the school's athletic teams quickly improved. In 1916, the football team defeated their rival Holy Cross for the first time since 1899. In 1918 O’Brien entered the United States Army as a chaplain. He returned to BC in 1919. That year, O'Brien and BC President William J. Devlin recruited Francis A. Reynolds to the position of graduate director of athletics. Reynolds was responsible for hiring football coach Frank Cavanaugh, hockey coaches Fred Rocque and Sonny Foley, baseball coaches Olaf Henriksen, Jack Slattery, and Hugh Duffy, and track coach Jack Ryder.

Philippines
In 1924, O’Brien left Boston College for the Philippines. In 1927 he was appointed Rector of Ateneo de Manila University by Rev. James J. Carlin. In July 1932 he was made treasurer of the Jesuit order in the Philippines. In August 1932, Ateneo de Manila University was destroyed by fire and O'Brien took over the College of San Jose in Manila. He oversaw the construction of new buildings and the expansion of existing ones so that the work of Ateneo de Manila could continue. O’Brien died on December 5, 1933, in Manila of a heart attack. He was 53 years old.

References

1880 births
1933 deaths
20th-century American Jesuits
American Jesuits
Academic staff of Ateneo de Manila University
Boston College Eagles athletic directors
Boston College faculty
Jesuit missionaries in the Philippines
People from Baltimore
St. Andrew-on-Hudson alumni
Woodstock College alumni